Baitang (Hakka: būgtŏng) is a town in northeastern Guangdong province, China, and is part of the Pearl River Delta. It is under the administration of Boluo County. The ancient beautiful town, one of the old revolutionary base areas, attracts foreign vacationers and investors.

Local residents of Baitang are generally Hakka originally from Meizhou.

Education
Baitang Middle School (柏塘中学)
Baitang Central Primary School (柏塘中心小学)

Notes

References

External links 

 Government website of Baitang

Boluo County
Towns in Guangdong